Holy Name Church in West Roxbury is a Roman Catholic church of the Archdiocese of Boston.

Among the largest and most distinguished buildings in the western section of Boston, the imposing Romanesque Revival church dominates the rotary where it is located and provides an interesting contrast to the Gothic St. Theresa Roman Catholic Church, a mile down Centre Street. Holy Name Church is a relatively large church. It has 2 floors, and mass can be said on either, although the upper church is larger.

Founding and early development
The parish was founded in 1927 under the leadership of Fr. William P. McNamara, the first pastor. Plans for a new large church of Romanesque Revival style were acquired in 1929 and building began. Although the basement church was ready for Midnight Mass in 1929 work on the superstructure progressed more slowly and the church was not completed until 1939.

Architecture
The architect of the church was Edward T. P. Graham who designed many Roman Catholic churches in Boston and the Midwest. The design of the dome in the main sanctuary is replicated from that of the Basilica di San Clemente in Rome. St. Clemente had been the titular church of Boston Cardinal William Henry O'Connell when Holy Name was built.

Holy Name Complex
A large Colonial Revival style rectory, also designed by Graham, is situated directly behind the church. The Holy Name Elementary School, Parish Hall and Convent designed in 1953 by architects Perry, Shaw and Hepburn is located directly across the street.

The stained glass was provided by the studios of Wilbur H. Burnham, Boston   who would also supply glass to St. Theresa Church of West Roxbury.

Pipe organ

In 1938 the church became home to one of the most distinguished organs in Boston, a large 3 manual organ opus 1691 built by the Wicks Organ Company It was designed by Henry Vincent Willis, grandson of "Father" Willis of the prestigious British organ building firm who was the tonal designer for Wicks at the time. He designed several highly regarded organs for Wicks including the Holy Name instrument and a slightly larger 4 manual instrument, opus 1503 for the Cathedral of Saint Mary of the Immaculate Conception in Peoria, Illinois.

Prior to his employment at Wicks Willis had worked for the Midmar-Losh Organ Company where he was heavily involved in the development of the largest organ in the World, the Boardwalk Hall Auditorium Organ in the Atlantic City Convention Center.

The pipes are divided between two large cases in the gallery and a separate 16 rank instrument located in the sanctuary. 
Both organs are controlled by twin 3-manual drawknob consoles, one in the gallery and the second in the sanctuary directly behind the altar.

The organ was one of the instruments featured in the 2000 convention of the Organ Historical Society.

In 2005, after more than 60 years of daily use, a complete refurbishing of the organ was begun. This work was completed in 2006.

Gallery

See also
List of churches in the Roman Catholic Archdiocese of Boston

References

External links 
 Holy Name - Diocesan information
 Roman Catholic Archdiocese of Boston
 Parish website

Roman Catholic churches in Boston
Roman Catholic churches completed in 1939
Christian organizations established in 1927
1927 establishments in Massachusetts
20th-century Roman Catholic church buildings in the United States